A toe tag is a piece of cardboard attached with string to the big toe of a deceased individual in a morgue. It is used for identification purposes, allowing the mortician, coroner, law enforcement, and others involved in the death process to correctly identify the corpse.

It usually bears the decedent's name, a case number if law enforcement is involved, and some descriptors like hair and eye color. In many places, actual toe tags are no longer used due to hygiene concerns but have been replaced by wrist and/or ankle bands that serve the same purpose.

See also
Body bag
Dog tag

References

Death customs
Funeral-related industry
Toes